In Greek mythology, Orseïs (Ancient Greek: Ὀρσηΐς, derived from ὄρσω - orsô, "to rouse, stir, awaken, excite or arise") was the water-nymph (Naiad) of a spring in Thessalia, Greece, and the mythical ancestor of the Greeks. In some accounts, she was described as a mountain nymph (oread) of Mt. Othrys and named as Othryis.

Biography 
It is uncertain whether Orseis was believed to be the daughter of Oceanus or the river-god of Thessalia, Peneios. There was even a possibility that she was the daughter of Zeus and Deino the Graeae. 

According to the Library, Orseis married Hellen, son of Deucalion and Pyrrha and brother of Pandora, the legendary eponymous ancestor of the Greeks. Their sons, Dorus, Xuthus, and Aeolus, according to Hesiod's Eoiae or Catalogue of Women together with the sons of Pandora, Graecus, Magnetas and Makedon with Zeus, became the founders of the seven primordial tribes of Hellas (Graecians, Magnetes, Makedones, Dorians, Achaeans, Ionians, and Aeolians). In some accounts, Xenopatra was also called the daughter of Hellen and Orseis.

Notes

References 
 Hesiod, Catalogue of Women from Homeric Hymns, Epic Cycle, Homerica translated by Evelyn-White, H G. Loeb Classical Library Volume 57. London: William Heinemann, 1914. Online version at theio.com 
 Pseudo-Apollodorus, The Library with an English Translation by Sir James George Frazer, F.B.A., F.R.S. in 2 Volumes, Cambridge, MA, Harvard University Press; London, William Heinemann Ltd. 1921. Online version at the Perseus Digital Library. Greek text available from the same website.
 West, M. L., The Hesiodic Catalogue of Women: Its Nature, Structure, and Origins, Clarendon Press Oxford, 1985. .

Naiads
Oreads
Nymphs
Queens in Greek mythology
Thessalian characters in Greek mythology
Thessalian mythology